Şahînê Bekirê Soreklî or Shahin Bekir Sorekli or Chahin Baker (born 1946) is a Kurdish writer, poet, journalist and translator.

He was born in the village of Mezrê in the Kurdish region of Kobani in Syria. He left Syria to Austria following matriculation in October 1965 and moved to Australia from Germany on 29 October 1968. He was hoping to be able to work for a year or two and return to Munich where he was studying but this did not eventuate. He met his wife Robyn Hyde while working for MAN Diesel in Kurri Kurri, NSW. They married in January 1971 and have two sons, Che and Shahn. In 1977 Soreklî was graduated from Macquarie University in Sydney with the combines degrees BA and Diploma of Education DipEd . He later acquired further qualifications in journalism, broadcasting, and the teaching of German . From 1978 to 2004 he was employed by New South Wales Department of Education and Training as a teacher and consultant. In 1979, he was elected as the head of the first Kurdish association in Australia and managed it for about six years. Between 1982 and 1983, he broadcast a one-hour long Kurdish English weekly program at 2SER FM Radio in Sydney. He was the founder of SBS Kurdish in 1984 beginning with Radio 2EA and remained the Editing Producer/broadcaster until retirement in 2015. His short stories, articles and poems have been published in many Kurdish newspapers, magazines and websites.
Sorekli dedicated most of his life to the Kurdish language and the Kurdish cause and has played important roles advancing the Kurdish community as well as multiculturism in Australia in the eighties and nineties. He founded the first Kurdish association in Australia in 1979.

Many poems of Mr.Sorekli were sung by Nizamettin Ariç or Feqiyê Teyran such as ( Zînê, Mihemedo, Kenê li Ser Bîrê, Jiyana Jineke Kurd (Eyşo), Ku De çûn, Dayê Rojek tê, Mîro, Cemîle),the most famous song is Dayê Rojek tê The poem was first sung by Nizamettin Ariç.It was later sung by Aynur Doğan and others without seeking permission or even writing the name of the writer.

His Motivation To Broadcast In Kurdish In Sydney 
Mr.Sorekli chose to broadcast in Kurdish because of his love for his mother tongue and because the Kurdish language was oppressed and there was no radio in Kurdish language where he came from. he also hoped it would benefit SBS Radio that broadcast in 68 ethnic languages and the Kurds in Australia and contribute to establishing a united community as he said on an interview

His Passion for the Kurdish Language 
As a writer in Kurmanji Kurdish he remained disappointed with the limited numbers of readers. This, however, did not discourage him to serve the Kurdish language in various ways, including the teaching of Kurdish grammar using Social Media. "As Kurdish (Kurmanji) writers we often face a wall because we cannot communicate with the masses as well as we would like to," Sorekli says. "As a result of being illiterate in their own language the mentality of many Kurds today has become much closer to the mentality of the people whose language they use, mainly Turkish, Arabic or Farsi (referring to Persian)," he adds.

His Advice For Kurdish Youth In The Diaspora and Kurdistan 
Thirty years ago he might have given a different advice. Now he his advice to the younger generation is to do all they can to have an aim in life and to pursue that aim with discipline and determination. "I would advise them to pursue a profession they like, a profession that can secure a job for them and guarantee progress both financially and professionally. Today’s circumstances also require people to be multi-skilled and ready to change professions. In today’s world the first university degree may not secure you a good position. Individuals may have to do a second degree or postgraduate degrees."

Involvement In Politics 
"Look at the Kurds in Australia, for instance. We don’t have a single high-ranking politician from Kurdish background. We may find parliamentarians, in some cases ministers, or successful business people of Italian, Greek, Armenian, Arab and Assyrian backgrounds but no one from Kurdish background." He advises the Kurdish people to follow in the steps of advanced democracies where free thinking, mutual respect and intellectual awakening are a reality. If this is the preference then hard work, planning, group-work, discipline and cooperation is needed, all of which are lacking amongst most Kurdish societies today. The new generation of politicians need to vitalise a machine that can create those requirements in order to overcome political and social corruption, internal hostilities and decayed political and religious ideologies. A new ideology is needed that can organise peaceful and constructive struggle to secure the legitimate rights of the Kurdish people in the country they are in at this stage.

Some of Shahin Sorekli's Works 
"Roja Dawîn ji Jiyana Mistê Kurê Salha Temo" (short story, Hêvî Journal, Kurdish Institute of Paris, 1982)
"Civata Pêxemberan" (short story, Hêvî Journal, 1983)
"Azadbûna Mehmet Karataş" (short story: 1985)
Wendabûn (Novel: 1987)
translation of The Lost Honour of Katharina Blum by Heinrich Böll (1997)
Em û Pirsa me (collection of articles, 1987)
Mehkemekirina Selahiddinê Eyûbî (play, 1989)
Jana Heft Salan (poetry, 1990)
Namûsa Emo (collection of short stories, 1994)
Pisîk jî Xewmnan Dibînin (2004)
Çîrokên 18 Salan (collection of short stories, 2005)
Veger (Novel: 2006)
Destana Dewrêşê Evdî (2019)
Nameyek ji Bavê min re (collection of short stories: 2009)
Helbestên ji Dil (collection of poems: 2019)
“55 short stories in 38 years,”,"55 Çîrokên 38 salan" was published by AVA publications in the Kurdish town Kobani.(collection of short stories: 2020)
 Kurd, Cîhan, Jîyan: 252 Gotarên bi mijarên ji dîroka me ya nûjen û rûdanên li Rojhilatê Navîn û cîhanê 1990-2020. Weşanên Pîrê, Viyena, 10/2021

Some of Shahin Sorekli's Short Stories- In Kurdish 
Mirina Xezalekê: 1981
Rojek ji Jiyana Mistê kurê Salha Temo: 1982
Kombûna Pêxemberan: 1983
Kujtina Du Mirovên Belengaz: 1983
Azadbûna M. K: 1984
Hindiyên Sor: 1984
Vegera malê: 1986
Namûsa Êmo 1986 - Kurteroman
Hîn Hebû Hêvî: 1987
Henry Armstrong Chû Cengê: 1987
ÇIVÎK JI SER DARAN KETIN
Nedî û Danestan: 1988
Rêwiyê Mirî: 1988
Karl Federmann: 1990
Payîz: 1992
Kujtina Rojê: 1993
Kûto: 1993
John Hyde: 1994
Firrîn: 1996
Pisîk jî Xewnan Dibînin: 1996
Xwekujtina Nameyekê: 1996
Afrîkayê Ma Te Dît: 1997
Rojîn: 1999
Parsger: 1999
Xweziya Ne Mirov bûma: 1999
Shkeft: 2000
Stemkarî û Hestên Tawanê: 2000
Mebesta Chîrokê: 2002
Bi Navê Xwedê: 2006
Profesor û Rîhrengîn: 2007
Hosteyê Koshka Hilweshiyayî: 2008
Telefonkirineke Janafer: 2008
Pîvaz : 2008
Xizanî: 2008
Xewnekê Bifroshe Min: 200?
Zarok û Dar: 2013
Pira Hilweshiyaî: 2015
Ya Shamî û Rojên Demê: 2015
Kobanî û Kalê bi ber Leheya Tofanê Ketî: 2017

References 

Kurdish-language writers
1946 births
Living people
Syrian emigrants to Australia